The Funafuti Lagoon Hotel formally known as Vaiaku Langi Hotel, or Vaiaku Lagi Hotel, is situated in Funafuti, in the Pacific island nation of Tuvalu. The hotel was built in 1993 with financial assistance from the government of Taiwan.

Features
It is Tuvalu's only hotel, though there are a few other small lodges without all the hotel amenities. The hotel is a government-owned establishment and has been recently upgraded and refurbished to service Tuvalu's growing tourist industry.

There are 16 guest rooms in the new section, and additional rooms in the older complex. There is a bar, barbecue area and dance floor.

“Wednesday Night Buffet Dinner” is a featured event. The dinner is followed by Tuvaluan dancing.

Location

The hotel faces the Funafuti Lagoon (known as Te Namo in the Tuvaluan language), overlooking the western ocean.

See also

References

Further reading
 Lonely Planet Guide: South Pacific & Micronesia

External links
 Funafuti Lagoon Hotel
 Vaiaku Lagi Hotel
 Official Tuvalu Tourism page
 Jane Resture website on Funafuti, Tuvalu

Hotels in Tuvalu
Funafuti
Hotel buildings completed in 1993
Hotels established in 1993
1993 establishments in Tuvalu